Margaret Klein Salamon is an American climate activist who is the Executive Director of the Climate Emergency Fund, and the founder and principal of Climate Awakening. In 2014, she co-founded The Climate Mobilization. She is the author of the book, "Facing the Climate Emergency: How to Transform Yourself with Climate Truth." She is an advocate for an "all hands on deck" mobilization against climate change.

Salamon was one of the originators of the Climate Emergency Declaration movement. She developed the strategy as well as helping to implement the first local declarations in Hoboken New Jersey and Montgomery County, Maryland, as well as working on a National level for a declaration of Climate Emergency. 

Salamon is the author of the white paper: "Leading the Public into Emergency Mode: A New Strategy for the Climate Movement".

Biography 
Margaret Klein Salamon was born in Ann Arbor Michigan in 1986.

A trained clinical psychologist, Salamon co-founded The Climate Mobilization in 2014 to advocate for a transformation of the economy, politics, and society to respond to the climate emergency. Salamon felt that there were no organizations telling the full truth of the climate emergency.

Salamon has highlighted the importance of processing climate grief the psychological reluctance of individuals to see the climate emergency as a threat, and the importance of empowerment self-defense. 

Her essays have appeared in The New York Times, Ecowatch, Grist, and The Hill. 

In 2020, Salamon published Facing the Climate Emergency: How to Transform Yourself with Climate Truth, a self-help guide about the climate emergency. 

In 2021, Salamon became the Executive Director of the Climate Emergency Fund. The group funds "more aggressive" non-violent civil disobedience about climate change.

White Paper "Leading the Public into Emergency Mode" 
According to Stanford University's, The Millennium Alliance for Humanity and the Biosphere (MAHB), the white paper, originally published in April, 2016, under the title, Leading the Public into Emergency Mode: A New Strategy for the Climate Movement "introduced a new paradigm for climate action: emergency mode.  In it,  Salamon argued that, in order to protect humanity and the living world, the climate movement must tell the truth about the climate emergency, and act as though that truth is real — employing emergency communications, militant tactics, and demanding an emergency mobilization from the government and all society, as the policy response."

Per MAHB, since publication, Salamon's recommendations "have been largely adopted by several new climate groups — Extinction Rebellion, School Strikers, Sunrise Movement, and more — leading to tremendous breakthroughs." This paper was updated in May 2019 in order to combine the theoretical discussion of emergency mode with an overview of the emerging Climate Emergency Movement.

Organisations
The Climate Emergency Fund (CEF) is a registered 501(c)(3) non-profit organization to fund and support individual activists and organizations working to educate the public on the threat of climate change and demand action from policy makers. The organization began operations in 2019. According to GivingCompass.org, CEF "supports only nonviolent, legal activities that reinforce the goal of constructively building public pressure and demanding urgent action from governments and corporations to address the climate emergency." 

Climate Awakening offers free “Climate Emotions Conversations” online, in which participants are taken through a series of explanatory videos and prompts that help them articulate and share their feelings about the climate emergency. 

The Climate Mobilization is a movement of people across the United States who seek to reclaim the future by initiating an emergency-speed, whole-society Climate Mobilization, reversing global warming and restoring a safe climate. It was founded by Salamon and Ezra Silk at the People’s Climate March in 2014, when there was no climate group publicly organizing around the scale an all-of-society, emergency-speed mobilization to zero emissions, with a level of government economic intervention and public investment not seen since WWII.

Media appearances 
Salamon has been cited as an expert and commentator on the climate emergency.  She speaks regularly on:

 The need for a widescale consciousness shift to prioritize climate mobilization
 That “operating in emergency mode is incredibly powerful once you get there”, as seen in World War Two
 The psychological defenses being used during this climate emergency, such as compartmentalization, wilful ignorance and intellectualization
 The self-growth from “really trying to face the climate emergency and process it emotionally”, then becoming an activist
 The drive to action from the “combination of morality with something new…like enlightened self interest.”

On May 1, 2022, Salamon published a guest op-ed essay in The New York Times entitled: "A ‘Life-Affirming’ Remedy for Climate Despair", regarding the Earth Day self-immolation of climate activist, Wynn Bruce.

Works 
 "Leading the Public into Emergency Mode: A New Strategy for the Climate Movement"  - https://margaretkleinsalamon.medium.com/leading-the-public-into-emergency-mode-b96740475b8f
 Facing the Climate Emergency: How to Transform Yourself With Climate Truth,

References

External links 
 Climate Awakening
 Climate Emergency Fund
 Articles on psychologytoday.com

Climate activists
Year of birth missing (living people)
Living people
Harvard College alumni
Adelphi University alumni